Esaal Alaya is a studio album by Egyptian musician Sherine. The album contains 11 tracks, released on January 23, 2012 to wide commercial and critical success.

Track listing
We El Nabi Law Gane
Nafse Afham Leh
Hatrooh
Aasabo Talaga
Wahda Be Wahda
Masaola Menak
Law Lesa Baaee
Da Mesh Habibi
Esaal Alaya
Bethke Fe Eih
Nafse Afham Leh Music

Chart performance 
Esaal Alaya debuted atop the Virgin Megastores physical sales chart in more than nine Arab regions, including Egypt, where it occupied the apex for 15 consecutive weeks and became one of the best-selling albums of 2012.

References 

2012 albums
Rotana Records albums
Sherine albums
Arabic-language albums